United Nations Security Council resolution 500, adopted on 28 January 1982, after considering an item on the agenda of the council and given the lack of unanimity amongst its permanent members, the council decided to call an emergency meeting of the United Nations General Assembly to discuss the Israeli occupation of the Golan Heights.

The resolution, which was previously vetoed by the United States on 20 January 1982, was adopted by 13 votes to none with two abstentions from the United Kingdom and United States.

Following the resolution, the Ninth emergency special session of the United Nations General Assembly took place.

See also
 Arab–Israeli conflict
 Golan Heights
 Israel–Syria relations
 List of United Nations Security Council Resolutions 401 to 500 (1976–1982)
 'Uniting for Peace' Resolution

References

External links
 
Text of the Resolution at undocs.org

 0500
 0500
Middle East peace efforts
 0500
 0500
1982 in Syria
1982 in Israel
January 1982 events